Hammam Chott is a town and commune in the Ben Arous Governorate, Tunisia. It is located 20 kilometers from the capital, Tunis, in the southern suburbs.  It is a seaside resort town.

The Palestine Liberation Organization (PLO) had its headquarters in Hammam Chott before an Israeli bombing attack in 1985.

On 1 October 1985, the PLO headquarters in Hammam Chott was bombed and destroyed by the Israeli Air Force in Operation Wooden Leg.

Origin of name
Chott in Arabic means "beach" which is appropriate due to Hammam Chott's location on the Gulf of Tunis.

See also
List of cities in Tunisia

References

Populated places in Ben Arous Governorate
Communes of Tunisia
Seaside resorts in Tunisia
Tunisia geography articles needing translation from French Wikipedia